Csornai Sport Egyesület is a professional football club based in Csorna, Győr-Moson-Sopron County, Hungary, that competes in the Megyei Bajnokság I, the fourth tier of Hungarian football.

Fans
The team has a march song produced by EVE SIX.

References

External links
 Profile on Magyar Futball

Football clubs in Hungary
1910 establishments in Hungary